Tihomir Balubdžić was a Yugoslav basketball player.

Playing career 
Balubdžić played for a Belgrade-based clubs Crvena zvezda and BSK of the Yugoslav First League. 

In the 1946 season, he won the National Championships with Crvena zvezda. Over seven 1946 Zvezda season games, Balubdžić averaged 1.3 points per game.

Over 15 appearances during the 1951 season for BSK, Balubdžić averaged 3.1 points per game.

References

KK Crvena zvezda players
OKK Beograd players
Yugoslav men's basketball players
Year of birth missing
Year of death missing
Place of birth missing
Place of death missing